Sean Core (born in Dublin) is an Irish former footballer who played as a half back.

He joined Shamrock Rovers in 1965 and played in 3  European Cup Winners' Cup games one of which was a draw at Dalymount Park against FC Bayern Munich.

He was part of the "Boston Rovers" squad that travelled to the United States in the summer of 1967, to take part in a tournament held to raise the profile of the game in that country.

In January 1968 he joined Sligo Rovers F.C. as a full-time professional. In March he was suspended for the rest of that season.

Signed for Shelbourne in August 1968.

In August 1972 he was placed on his own request, on the transfer list.

Played for Rialto before signing for Limerick F.C. in December 1972.

Was released at the end of the 1974/75 season.

Honours
  Top Four Cup
 Shamrock Rovers 1966
  Dublin City Cup
 Shamrock Rovers 1966/67
  FAI Cup
 Shamrock Rovers 1966

Sources 
 The Hoops by Paul Doolan and Robert Goggins

References

Republic of Ireland association footballers
Republic of Ireland under-23 international footballers
Shamrock Rovers F.C. players
Sligo Rovers F.C. players
Shelbourne F.C. players
Limerick F.C. players
League of Ireland players
United Soccer Association players
Boston Rovers players
Living people
Association football defenders
Year of birth missing (living people)